Pholodes is a genus of moths in the family Geometridae. It was described by David Stephen Fletcher in 1979, though several species were previously known. Its junior homonym is the anagrammatic Lophodes.

Species
Some species of this genus are:

Pholodes atrifasciata (Warren, 1893)
Pholodes australasiaria (Boisduval, 1832) (Australasia)
Pholodes difformaria (Herrich-Schäffer, 1858)
Pholodes fuliginea (Hampson, 1895) (India) - initially known as Scotosia fuliginea
Pholodes indigna (Warren, 1899)
Pholodes nigrescens (Warren, 1893) (India)
Pholodes rufiplaga (Warren, 1899)
Pholodes squamosa (Warren, 1896) (India)
Pholodes sinistraria (Guenée, 1857) (Australia) - type species, initially known as Lophodes sinistraria

References

Ennominae
Geometridae